Joseph Hoàng Văn Tiệm (September 12, 1938 − August 17, 2013) was a Vietnamese Roman Catholic bishop.

Ordained to the priesthood in 1973, Hoàng Văn Tiệm was named bishop of the Roman Catholic Diocese of Bùi Chu, Vietnam and died in 2013 while still in office.

References

1938 births
2013 deaths
People from Kiên Giang Province
21st-century Roman Catholic bishops in Vietnam